Ardgay railway station is a railway station serving the village of Ardgay and its neighbour Bonar Bridge in the Highland council area of Scotland. ScotRail, who manage the station, operate all services.

History 
Opened on 1 October 1864 as Bonar Bridge by the Inverness and Aberdeen Junction Railway and designed by Joseph Mitchell, it became the meeting point of the  Sutherland Railway and the Inverness and Ross-shire Railway. The station joined the Highland Railway, later becoming part of the London, Midland and Scottish Railway during the Grouping of 1923; it then passed on to the Scottish Region of British Railways on nationalisation in 1948. It was renamed Ardgay on 2 May 1977. When sectorisation was introduced by British Rail in the 1980s, the station was served by ScotRail until the privatisation of British Rail.

Platform layout 
Platform 1 on the southbound line can accommodate trains having ten coaches, but platform 2 on the northbound line can only hold five.

Facilities 

Both platforms have benches, but only platform 1 has a designated waiting area, as seen in the photo on the left. Platform 2 also has a help point, and there is a car park and bike racks adjacent to it. Platform 2 has step-free access, but platform 1 can only be accessed from the footbridge. As there are no facilities to purchase tickets, passengers must buy one in advance, or from the guard on the train.

Passenger volume 

The statistics cover twelve month periods that start in April.

Services 

On Sundays, there is one train in each direction.

References

Bibliography

External links 

 

Railway stations in Sutherland
Railway stations served by ScotRail
Railway stations in Great Britain opened in 1864
Former Highland Railway stations
Listed railway stations in Scotland
Category C listed buildings in Highland (council area)